Cornelius Francis "Neal" Finn (January 24, 1904 – July 7, 1933) was an American professional baseball second baseman. He played in Major League Baseball (MLB) for the Brooklyn Robins / Dodgers and Philadelphia Phillies. Finn was born in Brooklyn, New York.

Finn was also an alternate for the silver medal winning USA II bobsled team at the 1932 Winter Olympic Games. He died during the 1933 season after surgery to repair an ulcer.

In 321 games over four seasons, Finn posted a .262 batting average (274-for-1044) with 125 runs, 3 home runs and 102 RBI. He finished his career with a .961 fielding percentage playing at second and third base.

See also
 List of baseball players who died during their careers

External links

Major League Baseball second basemen
Brooklyn Robins players
Brooklyn Dodgers players
Philadelphia Phillies players
Bloomington Bloomers players
Wilkes-Barre Barons (baseball) players
Vernon Tigers players
Mission Bells players
Mission Reds players
Baseball players from New York (state)
Deaths from ulcers
1904 births
1933 deaths
Burials at Calvary Cemetery (Queens)